Bob Bryan and Mike Bryan were the defending champions but lost in the semifinals to David Ferrer and Fernando Vicente.

Mark Knowles and Daniel Nestor won in the final 6–3, 6–3 against Ferrer and Vicente.

Seeds

  Mark Knowles /  Daniel Nestor (champions)
  Bob Bryan /  Mike Bryan (semifinals)
  Chris Haggard /  Brian MacPhie (first round)
  David Adams /  Robbie Koenig (first round)

Draw

External links
 2003 Abierto Mexicano Telefonica Movistar Men's Doubles Draw

2003 Abierto Mexicano Telefonica Movistar
Doubles